In cryptography, the Elliptic Curve Digital Signature Algorithm (ECDSA) offers a variant of the Digital Signature Algorithm (DSA) which uses elliptic-curve cryptography.

Key and signature-size
As with elliptic-curve cryptography in general, the bit size of the private key believed to be needed for ECDSA is about twice the size of the security level, in bits. For example, at a security level of 80 bits—meaning an attacker requires a maximum of about  operations to find the private key—the size of an ECDSA private key would be 160 bits.  On the other hand, the signature size is the same for both DSA and ECDSA: approximately  bits, where  is the exponent in the formula , that is, about 320 bits for a security level of 80 bits, which is equivalent to  operations.

Signature generation algorithm
Suppose Alice wants to send a signed message to Bob. Initially, they must agree on the curve parameters .  In addition to the field and equation of the curve, we need , a base point of prime order on the curve;  is the multiplicative order of the point .

The order  of the base point  must be prime. Indeed, we assume that every nonzero element of the ring  is invertible, so that  must be a field. It implies that  must be prime (cf. Bézout's identity).

Alice creates a key pair, consisting of a private key integer , randomly selected in the interval ; and a public key curve point . We use  to denote elliptic curve point multiplication by a scalar.

For Alice to sign a message , she follows these steps:

 Calculate .  (Here HASH is a cryptographic hash function, such as SHA-2, with the output converted to an integer.)
(Note that  can be greater than  but not longer.)
 Calculate the curve point .
 Calculate . If , go back to step 3.
 Calculate . If , go back to step 3.
 The signature is the pair .  (And  is also a valid signature.)

Since , the attacker can now calculate the private key . 

This implementation failure was used, for example, to extract the signing key used for the PlayStation 3 gaming-console. 

Another way ECDSA signature may leak private keys is when  is generated by a faulty random number generator. Such a failure in random number generation caused users of Android Bitcoin Wallet to lose their funds in August 2013. 

To ensure that  is unique for each message, one may bypass random number generation completely and generate deterministic signatures by deriving  from both the message and the private key.

Signature verification algorithm
For Bob to authenticate Alice's signature, he must have a copy of her public-key curve point . Bob can verify  is a valid curve point as follows:

 Check that  is not equal to the identity element , and its coordinates are otherwise valid
 Check that  lies on the curve
 Check that 

After that, Bob follows these steps:

If not, the signature is invalid.
 Calculate , where HASH is the same function used in the signature generation. 
 Calculate the curve point . If  then the signature is invalid.
 The signature is valid if , invalid otherwise.

Note that an efficient implementation would compute inverse  only once. Also, using Shamir's trick, a sum of two scalar multiplications  can be calculated faster than two scalar multiplications done independently.

Correctness of the algorithm
It is not immediately obvious why verification even functions correctly.  To see why, denote as  the curve point computed in step 5 of verification,

 

 

Because elliptic curve scalar multiplication distributes over addition,

 

 

Collecting the common term ,

 

 

Since the inverse of an inverse is the original element, and the product of an element's inverse and the element is the identity, we are left with

 

This shows only that a correctly signed message will verify correctly; many other properties are required for a secure signature algorithm.

Public key recovery
Given a message  and Alice's signature  on that message, Bob can (potentially) recover Alice's public key:

If not, the signature is invalid.
Note that there may be several curve points satisfying these conditions, and each different  value results in a distinct recovered key.
 Calculate , where HASH is the same function used in the signature generation. 
 Calculate the curve point .
 The signature is valid if , matches Alice's public key.
 The signature is invalid if all the possible  points have been tried and none match Alice's public key.

Note that an invalid signature, or a signature from a different message, will result in the recovery of an incorrect public key. The recovery algorithm can only be used to check validity of a signature if the signer's public key (or its hash) is known beforehand.

Correctness of the recovery algorithm

 

From the definition  from signing step 4,

 

Because elliptic curve scalar multiplication distributes over addition,

 

 

 

Since the product of an element's inverse and the element is the identity, we are left with

 

The first and second terms cancel each other out,

 

This shows that a correctly signed message will recover the correct public key, provided additional information was shared to uniquely calculate curve point  from signature value .

Security
In December 2010, a group calling itself fail0verflow announced recovery of the ECDSA private key used by Sony to sign software for the PlayStation 3 game console. However, this attack only worked because Sony did not properly implement the algorithm, because  was static instead of random. As pointed out in the Signature generation algorithm section above, this makes  solvable, rendering the entire algorithm useless.

On March 29, 2011, two researchers published an IACR paper demonstrating that it is possible to retrieve a TLS private key of a server using OpenSSL that authenticates with Elliptic Curves DSA over a binary field via a timing attack. The vulnerability was fixed in OpenSSL 1.0.0e.

In August 2013, it was revealed that bugs in some implementations of the Java class SecureRandom sometimes generated collisions in the  value. This allowed hackers to recover private keys giving them the same control over bitcoin transactions as legitimate keys' owners had,  using the same exploit that was used to reveal the PS3 signing key on some Android app implementations, which use Java and rely on ECDSA to authenticate transactions.

Concerns 
Some concerns expressed about ECDSA:

 Political concerns: the trustworthiness of NIST-produced curves being questioned after revelations that the NSA willingly inserts backdoors into software, hardware components and published standards were made; well-known cryptographers have expressed doubts about how the NIST curves were designed, and voluntary tainting has already been proved in the past. (See also the libssh curve25519 introduction.) Nevertheless, a proof that the named NIST curves exploit a rare weakness, is missing yet.
 Technical concerns: the difficulty of properly implementing the standard, its slowness, and design flaws which reduce security in insufficiently defensive implementations.

Implementations 
Below is a list of cryptographic libraries that provide support for ECDSA:

 Botan
 Bouncy Castle
 cryptlib
 Crypto++
 Crypto API (Linux)
 GnuTLS
 libgcrypt
 LibreSSL
 mbed TLS
 Microsoft CryptoAPI
 OpenSSL
 wolfCrypt

See also
 EdDSA
 RSA (cryptosystem)

References

Further reading
 Accredited Standards Committee X9, ASC X9 Issues New Standard for Public Key Cryptography/ECDSA, Oct. 6, 2020. Source
 Accredited Standards Committee X9, American National Standard X9.62-2005, Public Key Cryptography for the Financial Services Industry, The Elliptic Curve Digital Signature Algorithm (ECDSA), November 16, 2005.
 Certicom Research, Standards for efficient cryptography, SEC 1: Elliptic Curve Cryptography, Version 2.0, May 21, 2009.
 López, J. and Dahab, R. An Overview of Elliptic Curve Cryptography, Technical Report IC-00-10, State University of Campinas, 2000.
 Daniel J. Bernstein, Pippenger's exponentiation algorithm, 2002.
 Daniel R. L. Brown, Generic Groups, Collision Resistance, and ECDSA, Designs, Codes and Cryptography, 35, 119–152, 2005.  ePrint version
 Ian F. Blake, Gadiel Seroussi, and Nigel Smart, editors, Advances in Elliptic Curve Cryptography, London Mathematical Society Lecture Note Series 317, Cambridge University Press, 2005.

External links
 Digital Signature Standard; includes info on ECDSA
 The Elliptic Curve Digital Signature Algorithm (ECDSA); provides an in-depth guide on ECDSA. Wayback link

Public-key cryptography
Elliptic curve cryptography
Digital signature schemes
Digital Signature Standard